Pieter Jacobus Conradie (born 20 October 1994) is a South African sprinter specialising in the 400 metres.

International competitions

1Disqualified in the final

Personal bests
Outdoor
200 metres – 21.31(0.0 m/s, Potchefstroom 2018)
400 metres – 45.15 (Potchefstroom2017)
800 metres – 1:48.08 (Johannesburg 2016)

Indoor
200 metres – 22.23 (Albuquerque 2014)
400 metres – 48.39 (Albuquerque 2014)

References

External links
All-Athletics profile

1994 births
Living people
South African male sprinters
Sportspeople from Pretoria
Universiade medalists in athletics (track and field)
World Athletics Championships athletes for South Africa
Universiade bronze medalists for South Africa
Medalists at the 2013 Summer Universiade